Dongusuchus (meaning Donguz River crocodile in Greek, for the area where the type specimen was found) is an extinct genus of archosaur. Fossils have been found from the Donguz Formation outcropping on the banks of the Donguz River in the Orenburg Oblast of Russia. They are associated with a fossil assemblage called the Eryosuchus Fauna, named after the capitosaurid Eryosuchus, the most common organism found from the assemblage. The locality dates back to the Anisian and early Ladinian stages of the Middle Triassic.

Sennikov (1988) and Gower and Sennikov (2000) suggested that Dongusuchus was a gracile rausuchian with a long, sigmoidally curved neck, unlike the more typical robust short-necked rauisuchians that appear later in the Triassic. More recently, Nesbitt (2009) argued that Dongusuchus most probably represents a non-archosaurian archosauriform. According to Nesbitt (2009), the poorly-defined crista tibiofibularis and the absence of a distinct anteromedial tuber of the proximal portion of the thighbone in Dongusuchus suggest that it is not a member of Archosauria. Although Gower and Sennikov (2000) suggested that the distinct sigmoidal shape of Dongusuchus femur is unique, a similar shape is present in the femora of some phytosaurs. A paratype tibia was also found to be more closely related to Euparkeria and phytosaurs, on the basis of its convex and rounded distal surface. Additionally, the proximal surface of the tibia lacks a trait present in nearly all pseudosuchians, a depression on its lateral condyle. Nesbitt assigned Dongusuchus to Archosauriformes on the basis of the following traits: its femur has a low fourth trochanter, and the distal condyles do not expand markedly beyond the shaft. These traits suggest that Dongusuchus was an archosauriform more derived than Erythrosuchus.

Dongusuchus was also excluded from Archosauria by Niedźwiedzki et al. (2014) and a new large cladistic analysis of archosauromorphs by Ezcurra (2016) found Dongusuchus to be the sister taxon to the Indian Yarasuchus. Both Dongusuchus and Yarasuchus were recovered in a clade with Spondylosoma and Teleocrater by Nesbitt et al. (2017) at the base of Avemetatarsalia, making them more closely related to bird-line archosaurs.

References

Prehistoric avemetatarsalians
Anisian genera
Middle Triassic reptiles of Europe
Fossil taxa described in 1988
Taxa named by Andrey G. Sennikov